Tuck is an unincorporated community in Daviess County, Kentucky, United States.  It is located at the intersection of Highway 554 and Todd Bridge Road.  Unincorporated villages of Pettit and Sutherland are located nearby.

References

Unincorporated communities in Daviess County, Kentucky
Unincorporated communities in Kentucky